Karovići (Cyrillic: Каровићи) is a village in the municipalities of Novo Goražde, Republika Srpska and Goražde, Bosnia and Herzegovina.

Demographics 
According to the 2013 census, its population was 41, with 22 of them living in the Novo Goražde part, and 19 in the Goražde part.

References

Populated places in Novo Goražde
Populated places in Goražde